is a Japanese company. Its headquarters are at Akishima-shi, Tokyo Prefecture, a region of Tokyo Metropolis. It was established in 1937 as a manufacturer of military aircraft in Akishima-shi. In World War II it was one of two companies manufacturing the Showa/Nakajima L2D, a license-built Douglas DC-3 variant. It also manufactured other military aircraft.

References 

Aircraft manufacturers of Japan
Mitsui
Manufacturing companies based in Tokyo
Japanese companies established in 1937
Manufacturing companies established in 1937